The 2009 Booker Prize for Fiction was awarded at a ceremony on 6 October 2009. The Man Booker longlist of 13 books was announced on 2 August,  and was narrowed down to a shortlist of six on 8 September.  The Prize was awarded  to Hilary Mantel for Wolf Hall.

Judging panel
James Naughtie (Chair)
Lucasta Miller
Michael Prodger
Professor John Mullan
Sue Perkins

Nominees (Shortlist)

Nominees (Longlist)

References

Man Booker
Booker Prizes by year
2009 awards in the United Kingdom